Ahu Tappeh (also Romanized as Āhū Tappeh) is a village in Chaharduli Rural District, in the Central District of Asadabad County, Hamadan Province, Iran. At the 2006 census, its population was 293, in 63 families.

References 

Populated places in Asadabad County